The Bodie Island Lifesaving Station, also known as the Bodie Island Coast Guard Station, is located on the Outer Banks of North Carolina at the southern end of Bodie Island, within Cape Hatteras National Seashore. The  district includes a residence, the lifesaving station, the Coast Guard station, and an observation tower, as well as a number of utility buildings. The facility was turned over to the National Park Service in 1953, with the establishment of the national seashore. The primary structure, the lifesaving station, was built in 1878, and was converted to a residence when the Coast Guard station was built in 1925. It was moved to its present location in 1955, as it was threatened by shoreline erosion. The Coast Guard station was altered the same year to provide housing and office space for the National Park Service.

See also
Bodie Island Light

References

External links

The U.S. Lifesaving Service at Cape Hatteras National Seashore

Government buildings on the National Register of Historic Places in North Carolina
Historic American Buildings Survey in North Carolina
Buildings and structures in Dare County, North Carolina
Historic districts on the National Register of Historic Places in North Carolina
Buildings and structures in North Carolina
United States Coast Guard
National Register of Historic Places in Dare County, North Carolina
Government buildings completed in 1878
1878 establishments in North Carolina